The Tetuanists, also known as the Tetuanist Conservatives (T), were a political faction within the Liberal Conservative Party (PLC), led by Carlos O'Donnell, 2nd Duke of Tetuan. After Antonio Cánovas del Castillo's assassination in 1897, O'Donnell initially took over the PLC. However, most Conservative MPs joined the ascendant Conservative Union of Francisco Silvela. O'Donnell eventually split from the PLC, allowing Silvela to take over the party as the official Conservative leader.

The faction disbanded after O'Donnell's death in February 1903.

References

Conservative Party (Spain)
Catholic political parties
Defunct political parties in Spain
Political parties established in 1898
Political parties disestablished in 1903
1898 establishments in Spain
1903 disestablishments in Spain
Restoration (Spain)